"Trapped in the Sky" is the first episode of Thunderbirds, a British Supermarionation television series created by Gerry and Sylvia Anderson and filmed by their production company AP Films (APF) for ITC Entertainment. Written by the Andersons, it was first broadcast on ATV Midlands on 30 September 1965.

Set in the 2060s, the series follows the exploits of International Rescue, an organisation that uses technologically-advanced rescue vehicles to save human life. The main characters are ex-astronaut Jeff Tracy, founder of International Rescue, and his five adult sons, who pilot the organisation's main fleet: the Thunderbird machines. In "Trapped in the Sky", master criminal the Hood plants a bomb on board the new atomic-powered airliner Fireflash before it departs on its maiden flight. Unable to land for fear of setting off the bomb, the crew and passengers' only hope of survival lies with International Rescue.

While planning the episode, the Andersons drew inspiration from Gerry's memories of his National Service in the RAF, during which he witnessed the fatal crash of a Mosquito aircraft and the emergency landing of a damaged Spitfire. To save studio space, special effects director Derek Meddings filmed the rescue of Fireflash on a static set using a system of looping canvasses instead of a miniature runway.

"Trapped in the Sky" was originally filmed as a 25-minute pilot in late 1964. Lew Grade, the Andersons' financial backer, was so impressed by the production that he ordered APF to re-write and extend every Thunderbirds episode from 25 to 50 minutes so that the series would fill a one-hour TV timeslot. Well received on its first broadcast, "Trapped in the Sky" is widely regarded as one of the best episodes of Thunderbirds. It was adapted into an audio play in 1966 and had its first UK-wide showing in 1991 on BBC 2. It was later re-made as "Fireflash", the fifth episode of the remake series Thunderbirds Are Go.

Plot
The Hood (voiced by Ray Barrett), a criminal mastermind based in an ancient temple in Malaysia, is telepathically linked to his half-brother Kyrano (voiced by David Graham), the manservant to the Tracy family on Tracy Island. Using this connection to extract information from Kyrano, the Hood learns that International Rescue – an organisation formed by Jeff Tracy (voiced by Peter Dyneley) and his five sons – is now operational. The psychological trauma of the Hood's coercion causes Kyrano to faint in front of Jeff.

Determined to acquire the secrets of International Rescue's Thunderbird machines, the Hood plots to engineer a rescue situation that will give him the perfect opportunity to spy on the organisation. Travelling to London International Airport, he plants a bomb within the landing gear hydraulics of Fireflash, a new atomic-powered hypersonic airliner departing for its maiden flight to Tokyo. Its passengers include Kyrano's daughter Tin-Tin (voiced by Christine Finn). After Fireflash takes off, the Hood anonymously calls air traffic control to reveal his sabotage, warning Commander Norman that the bomb will detonate on landing.

ATC alerts Fireflashs Captain Hanson, who tells Norman that the shield around the airliner's nuclear reactor requires regular servicing and that if Fireflash does not land within three hours everyone on board will die of radiation exposure. ATC commandeers a military plane that docks with Fireflash in the air, allowing Lieutenant Bob Meddings to gain access through a service hatch and attempt to remove the bomb. The operation ends disastrously when Meddings loses his grip and falls out of the plane, deploying his parachute just moments before hitting the ground.

John Tracy (voiced by Ray Barrett), who has been monitoring radio transmissions from space station Thunderbird 5, reports the unfolding events to his father on Tracy Island. Jeff dispatches Scott and Virgil (voiced by Shane Rimmer and David Holliday) to London in Thunderbirds 1 and 2. Landing at the airport, Scott assures Norman of International Rescue's good faith but orders that no photographs be taken of the Thunderbird machines. Airport police move in to guard Thunderbird 1, but the Hood, disguised as one of the officers, breaks in and photographs the cockpit. Scott is alerted by the on-board camera detector and the Hood flees in one of the police cars, chased up the M1 motorway by police.

Landing Thunderbird 2, Virgil deploys two remote-controlled Elevator Cars and a manned master car. The plan is to guide Fireflash into a gentle landing on top of the cars to avoid setting off the bomb. However, the first rescue attempt is aborted after one of the remote-controlled cars suffers a mechanical failure and crashes into a parked aircraft. Virgil activates a reserve car and Fireflash begins a second descent, successfully making contact with all three cars. Virgil brakes but then loses control of the master car; he crashes into a ditch but is unhurt. Supported by the other cars, Fireflash comes to a halt and the bomb, though dislodged by the inertia, fails to explode.

Learning that the Hood has evaded the police, Scott alerts International Rescue's London agents, Lady Penelope and her chauffeur Parker (voiced by Sylvia Anderson and David Graham). Chasing the Hood in FAB 1, Penelope's specially-modified Rolls-Royce, Penelope and Parker blast him off the motorway with the car's machine gun. Although the Hood survives, his photographs are ruined and he swears revenge on International Rescue.

Back on Tracy Island, Jeff has Kyrano examined by a doctor from the mainland. After giving Kyrano a clean bill of health, the doctor mentions the Fireflash incident and says that he would be honoured to shake International Rescue's hand. With a parting handshake, Jeff grants the unknowing doctor his wish, then tells his sons, "Boys, I think we're in business."

Production

The plot of "Trapped in the Sky" was inspired by Gerry Anderson's memories of his National Service in the RAF from 1947 to 1949. While stationed at RAF Manston, he saw a Mosquito plane go out of control and crash to the ground during an air show, killing 20 people. A few months later, a Spitfire with a damaged undercarriage successfully made an emergency landing at the base. These incidents formed the basis of the story, which sees the Hood plant a bomb on the airliner Fireflash.

Anderson dictated the script of the 25-minute pilot to his wife, Sylvia, at their villa in Portugal over four sessions during the spring of 1964. At this stage, the series had the working title "International Rescue" and the star vehicles were called "Rescues 1" to "5". Although the episode has no on-screen title, it was referred to throughout the production as "Trapped in the Sky". As an in-joke, the guest character Lieutenant Bob Meddings was named after two of APF's staff: art director Bob Bell and special effects director Derek Meddings. Meddings' original design sketch for Fireflash indicated that the airliner was flown by BOAC; in the completed episode, it is operated by the fictional "Air Terrainean".

Filming
After five months of pre-production, filming began in the late summer of 1964. The Fireflash landing sequence presented Meddings with the challenge of having to film a scale runway inside a relatively small effects studio that offered little scope for camera movement. Rather than build a miniature runway and move the camera, his solution was to isolate the basic set elements (the grass verge in the foreground, the sky background and the runway separating them) and construct separate loops of canvas, each painted to represent one element; the canvasses were then fitted to rollers that were run at speeds proportionate to their distances from the camera, creating the illusion of a dynamic shot on a continuous set. This technique, which Meddings called the "rolling road" (or "roller-road"), was a progression of the "rolling sky" technique that he had created to film aerial sequences on APF's previous series, Stingray. The crash of the remote-controlled Elevator Car was originally an error, caused when the wire pulling the scale model unexpectedly snapped in the middle of a shot. Meddings was so impressed with the result that he asked the Andersons to write the crash into the script. The original footage of the car losing control was then supplemented by an additional shot that shows it hitting the stationary aircraft and bursting into flames.

The dialogue was recorded before actor Matt Zimmerman was hired as the voice of Jeff's youngest son, Alan Tracy. For this episode only, Alan's dialogue (consisting of a single line: "OK, father") was supplied by Ray Barrett, the voice of John. Despite this, Zimmerman is still listed in the episode's closing credits. The closing scene with the doctor includes a continuity error: when Jeff initiates "Operation Cover-up" to maintain International Rescue's secrecy, portraits of the Tracy brothers in uniform are replaced with alternatives that show them in mufti; however, in a subsequent shot, the edge of a uniform is still visible.

Post-production
The incidental music was recorded in December 1964 at Olympic Studios in Barnes with a 30-piece orchestra. The opening and closing theme music are variations on the series' main theme, "The Thunderbirds March", and are unique to the episode. Until a very late stage of production, the closing credits were to be accompanied by a sung end theme – "Flying High", performed by Gary Miller – which series composer Barry Gray wrote to contrast with the instrumental opening theme. However, Anderson and Gray later decided that the song was tonally unsuitable and replaced it with the march two weeks before the TV première.

Like other early episodes of Thunderbirds, "Trapped in the Sky" was originally 25 minutes long. This running time was doubled after a preview screening that was attended by Lew Grade, APF's owner and financial backer. Grade was so impressed with the story and effects that at the end of the screening, he declared "That's not a television series, that's a feature film!" and ordered Gerry Anderson to re-write and expand all episodes to fill a one-hour timeslot. He later increased the series' budget per episode from £25,000 to £38,000.

"Trapped in the Sky" and another eight fully or partially filmed episodes were each extended to 50 minutes by adding new scenes and subplots. For "Trapped in the Sky", these included Lieutenant Meddings' boarding of Fireflash and International Rescue's abortive first rescue attempt. The additional material was filmed during the production of "Operation Crash-Dive", which was written as a sequel to "Trapped in the Sky" and sees the return of Fireflash.

Broadcast and reception
"Trapped in the Sky" was first broadcast on 30 September 1965 on ATV Midlands. For its Granada Television premiere on 20 October, the episode was transmitted in an alternative two-part format.

In the early 1990s, the broadcast rights to Thunderbirds were acquired by the BBC, paving the way for the series' first UK-wide network transmissions. "Trapped in the Sky" was first shown on BBC2 on 20 September 1991, when it was seen by nearly seven million viewers. It was repeated in 1992 and (for the first time with surround sound) on 3 September 2000.

Critical response

Upon its original broadcast, "Trapped in the Sky" was praised by L Marsland Gander of The Daily Telegraph, who called it "a show that has to be seen to be disbelieved." Writing for the same newspaper in 2011, Simon Heffer recalled watching the episode as a boy: "I felt as though the whole landscape of what passes for my imagination had been changed ... It caused an excitement of the sort that is possible only for the very young, and it lasted for days. Indeed, every Saturday night was a renewal of the miracle." Sylvia Anderson noted that as the first episode of the series, "Trapped in the Sky" includes a large amount of exposition. She considered the roles of Penelope and Parker "brief but effective".

Mike Fillis of TV Zone and Cult Times magazines considers the episode a "tour de force" and a series highlight, describing the story as "riveting" and the bomb plot as "very topical". Stuart Galbraith IV of DVD Talk likens the premise to "an airborne version of Speed". Marcus Hearn praises the episode's suspense and "extraordinary" effects. He also notes its "fast-paced Hollywood style" and focus on nuclear danger, describing it as a "topical spectre that would become a preoccupation in future episodes." Jon Abbott of TV Zone judges the tension "of feature-film quality" but also comments that "the total lack of security for the Fireflash nags at the viewer." He calls the idea of a nuclear-powered aircraft "wonderfully pointless", adding that it "could only have been dreamed up in the '60s, when science was unquestioned and the possibility of building something so silly always outweighed any safety considerations."

In 2004, "Trapped in the Sky" was re-released on DVD in North America as part of A&E Video's The Best of Thunderbirds: The Favorite Episodes collection. Reviewing the release for website DVD Verdict, David Gutierrez gave the episode a score of 95 out of 100, calling the rescue "amazing" and adding: "Television rarely has moments as exciting as the Fireflash attempting a forced landing." In 2019, British magazine TV Years (a sister publication of TV Choice) listed the "incredibly tense" Fireflash rescue as the seventh-greatest moment in TV science fiction.

A BBC Online retrospective describes Fireflash as a "beautifully-envisioned, Concorde-like craft" and compares the London Airport lounge to "a set from a Dean Martin movie". Model-maker Martin Bower praises the "realistic" design of the Elevator Cars, believing them to be "among the most memorable of vehicles". In a review of the Thunderbirds soundtrack, BBC Online's Morag Reavley praises the incidental musical piece "Fireflash Landing", describing it as one of several "catchy, pulse-quickening tunes" that "come fast and furious."

Vincent Law of fanzine Andersonic argues that the episode's status as a "pilot" is not detrimental to the plot, which he regards as being based on "advanced technology, upon which the characters are reliant, going awry." He criticises some of the characterisation, noting that by the end of the episode Tin-Tin seems to be none the worse for her ordeal aboard Fireflash. He also describes the dialogue as "limp and routine at times ... and overall much less witty than Stingray." Nonetheless, he sums up "Trapped in the Sky" as "a great opener, arguably the best episode of the series."

Adaptations
The episode has had several audio adaptations. The first of these was an audio play, narrated by Shane Rimmer in character as Scott Tracy, which was first released as the Century 21 mini-album Thunderbird 1 (code MA 108) in 1966. In 1990, the play was transmitted on BBC Radio 5 as the first episode of a Thunderbirds radio series, with an introduction by Gerry Anderson and new narration by Rimmer. The episode was adapted for Penguin Audiobooks in 2001.

On 18 December 1994, "Trapped in the Sky" aired in re-edited form on US network UPN as the first episode of Turbocharged Thunderbirds, a PolyGram-Bohbot co-production that combined footage from original Thunderbirds episodes with new live-action sequences featuring a pair of Californian teenagers. It was subsequently re-made as "Fireflash", the fifth episode of the re-imagined Thunderbirds series Thunderbirds Are Go. First broadcast on 25 April 2015, the remake episode re-uses characters and plot elements from the original, including the Captain Hanson and the rescue involving the Elevator Cars.

References

Works cited

Originally published as:

External links

"Trapped in the Sky" at TheVervoid.com
"Trapped in the Sky" at TVCentury21.com  episode overview and design information

1965 British television episodes
Airports in fiction
British television series premieres
Television episodes set in London
Thunderbirds (TV series) episodes
Works set on airplanes